General elections were held in India on 3 and 6 January 1980 to elect the members of the 7th Lok Sabha. The Janata Party alliance came into power in the 1977 general elections amidst public anger with the Indian National Congress (INC) and the Emergency. However, its position was weak; the loose coalition barely held on to a majority with only 295 seats in the Lok Sabha and never quite had a firm grip on power. Bharatiya Lok Dal leaders Charan Singh and Jagjivan Ram, who had quit the INC, were members of the Janata alliance but were at loggerheads with Prime Minister Morarji Desai. The tribunals the government had set up to investigate human rights abuses during the Emergency appeared vindictive.

The Janata Party, an amalgam of socialists and nationalists, split in 1979 when several coalition members including the Bharatiya Lok Dal and several members of the Socialist Party withdrew support for the government. Subsequently, Desai lost a vote of confidence in parliament and resigned. Charan Singh, who had retained some partners of the Janata alliance, was sworn in as Prime Minister in June 1979. The INC promised to support Singh in parliament but later backed out just two days before the Government was scheduled to prove its majority on the floor of Lok Sabha. Charan Singh, forced to resign, called for elections in January 1980 and is the only Prime Minister of India never to have obtained the confidence of Parliament. In the run up to the general elections, Indira Gandhi's leadership faced a formidable political challenge from a galaxy of regional satraps  and prominent leaders of Janata party like Satyendra Narayan Sinha and Karpuri Thakur in Bihar, Ramakrishna Hegde in Karnataka, Sharad Pawar in Maharashtra, Devi Lal in Haryana & Biju Patnaik in Orissa. Janata Party contested the election with Jagjivan Ram as its Prime Ministerial candidate. However, internal feud  between Janata Party leaders and the political instability in the country worked in favour of Indira Gandhi's Congress (I), that reminded voters of the strong government of Indira Gandhi during campaigning.

In the ensuing elections, the INC won 353 seats and the Janata Party just 31 seats, with Charan Singh's Janata Party (Secular) taking 41. The Janata Party alliance continued to split over the subsequent years.

Results

See also
Election Commission of India
1977 Indian presidential election

References

 
General
General elections in India
India
India